Hadlock Field is a minor league baseball stadium in Portland, Maine. It is primarily home to the Portland Sea Dogs of the Eastern League but also the Portland High School Bulldogs and Deering High School Rams baseball teams. The stadium is named for Edson B. Hadlock Jr., a long-time Portland High School baseball coach and physics teacher and member of the Maine Baseball Hall of Fame.

History and development
The park opened on April 18, 1994, with a capacity of 6,000. A year later, 500 seats were added, boosting capacity to 6,500. Expansion in 1998 increased capacity to 6,860 and in 2002 to 6,975. About 400 seats were added in right field before the start of the 2006 season, and the park currently seats 7,368. Hadlock Field is located between Interstate 295, the historic Fitzpatrick Stadium, and the Portland Exposition Building, the second-oldest arena in continuous operation in the United States. In 2003, when the Sea Dogs affiliated with the Boston Red Sox, a replica Green monster, called the Maine Monster, was added to left field to match the original at the Red Sox' Fenway Park. A replica Citgo sign and Coke bottle were added as well to make the field look even more like Fenway Park.

In 2006, the tenant Sea Dogs were Eastern League champions. New video boards were added prior to the 2014 season.

Field of Dreams Day at Hadlock Field is always a special date on the Portland Sea Dogs schedule. It is celebrated on the first Sunday of September and is usually a sold-out event, which features the team wearing 1926 Portland Eskimos uniforms. Much like the Hollywood film, with the cornfield set up in center field, the Sea Dogs players receive a loud standing ovation when they began to emerge through the stalks and ran onto the field for the Fan Appreciation Day Game.

In April 2018, Hadlock was named one of the 10 best minor league baseball stadiums. During the 2019 offseason,  new lighting was installed, replacing the prior metal-halide lamps with LED lamps and reducing power consumption by nearly 50%.

Gallery

References

External links

 

Baseball venues in Maine
High school baseball venues in the United States
Sports venues in Portland, Maine
Sports venues completed in 1994
Portland Sea Dogs
Eastern League (1938–present) ballparks